The Women's 4x200m Freestyle Relay event at the 2007 Pan American Games occurred at the Maria Lenk Aquatic Park in Rio de Janeiro, Brazil, with the final being swum on July 18.

Medalists

Results

Finals
The final was held on July 18.

Preliminaries
The heats was held on July 17.

References
For the Record, Swimming World Magazine, September 2007 (p. 48+49)
2007 Pan Am Games results: Women: 4x200m Freestyle Relay from sports123.com; retrieved 2009-08-12.

Freestyle Relay, Women's 4x200
2007 in women's swimming